McCormack-Bowman House is a historic home located in Franklin Township, Hendricks County, Indiana.  It was built about 1846, and is a one-story, central passage plan, frame dwelling with Greek Revival style design elements.  It has a gable roof, sits on a brick foundation, and features a one-bay centrally placed entrance portico added in the 1930s.

It was added to the National Register of Historic Places in 1995.

References

Houses on the National Register of Historic Places in Indiana
Greek Revival houses in Indiana
Houses completed in 1846
National Register of Historic Places in Hendricks County, Indiana
Buildings and structures in Hendricks County, Indiana